Tokio is a masculine Japanese given name.

Possible writings
Tokio can be written using different combinations of kanji characters. Some examples:

時雄, "hour, masculine"
時男, "hour, man"
時夫, "hour, husband"
刻雄, "engrave, masculine"
刻男, "engrave, man"
刻夫, "engrave, husband"
晨雄, "morning, masculine"
期雄, "period, masculine"
登喜夫, "climb up, rejoice, husband"
登紀夫, "climb up, chronicle, husband" 

The name can also be written in hiragana ときお or katakana トキオ.

Notable people with the name
, Japanese hurdler
, Japanese footballer
, Japanese politician
, Japanese cross-country skier
, Japanese actor and voice actor
, Japanese physicist
, Japanese table tennis player

Japanese masculine given names